Duluth High School is a public secondary school in Duluth, a suburb of Atlanta, Georgia, United States. It provides education for grades 9-12 and is operated by Gwinnett County Public Schools.

The school was built in 1958 and serves Duluth, Berkeley Lake, Peachtree Corners, and unincorporated portions of western Gwinnett County. As of 2019, it has 2,741 students enrolled.

DHS holds a Blue Ribbon School award. In its 2012 Georgia rankings, U.S. News & World Report ranked it tenth among all public, charter and magnet schools, fourth among all public schools, and first among all Gwinnett County public schools. Niche ranked Duluth as the most diverse public high school in Georgia and the 24th most diverse public high school in America.

Notable alumni
James Dashner, American writer best known for The Maze Runner series
Nick Green, MLB baseball player
Brian McCann, MLB baseball player
Monica Padman, actress and podcaster
George Rogers, NFL football player and Heisman Trophy winner

References

External links
Official school website

Public high schools in Georgia (U.S. state)
Schools in Gwinnett County, Georgia
Educational institutions established in 1958
1958 establishments in Georgia (U.S. state)